Merced County, is a county located in the northern San Joaquin Valley section of the Central Valley, in the U.S. state of California.

As of the 2020 census, the population was 281,202. The county seat is Merced. The county is named after the Merced River.

Merced County comprises the Merced, CA Metropolitan Statistical Area, which is included in the Modesto-Merced, CA Combined Statistical Area. It is located north of Fresno County and Fresno, and southeast of Santa Clara County and San Jose.

History
The county derives its name from the Merced River, or El Río de Nuestra Señora de la Merced (River of Our Lady of Mercy), named in 1806 by an expedition headed by Gabriel Moraga, which came upon it at the end of a hot dusty ride on the El Camino Viejo across the San Joaquin Valley in Spanish colonial Las Californias Province.

Between 1841 and 1844, during the period when Alta California was a territory of independent Mexico, four Mexican land grants were made in what became Merced County: Rancho Orestimba y Las Garzas, Rancho Panoche de San Juan y Los Carrisolitos, Rancho San Luis Gonzaga,  and Rancho Sanjon de Santa Rita

Merced County was formed in 1855 from parts of Mariposa County. Parts of its territory were given to Fresno County in 1856.

Geography

National protected areas
 Merced National Wildlife Refuge
 San Luis National Wildlife Refuge

Demographics

2020 census

Note: the US Census treats Hispanic/Latino as an ethnic category. This table excludes Latinos from the racial categories and assigns them to a separate category. Hispanics/Latinos can be of any race.

2011

Places by population, race, and income

2010 Census
The 2010 United States Census reported that Merced County had a population of 255,793. The racial makeup of Merced County was 148,381 (58.0%) White, 9,926 (3.9%) African American, 3,473 (1.4%) Native American, 18,836 (7.4%) Asian, 583 (0.2%) Pacific Islander, 62,665 (24.5%) from other races, and 11,929 (4.7%) from two or more races.  Hispanic or Latino of any race were 140,485 persons (54.9%).

2000
As of the census of 2000, there were 210,554 people, 63,815 households, and 49,775 families residing in the county. The population density was 109 people per square mile (42/km2). There were 68,373 housing units at an average density of 36 per square mile (14/km2). The racial makeup of the county was 56.2% White, 3.8% Black or African American, 1.2% Native American, 6.8% Asian, 0.2% Pacific Islander, 26.1% from other races, and 5.7% from two or more races. 45.3% of the population were Hispanic or Latino of any race. 6.6% were of Portuguese and 6.0% German ancestry according to Census 2000. 55.1% spoke English, 35.3% Spanish, 3.2% Hmong, 2.9% Portuguese and 1.0% Punjabi as their first language.

There were 63,815 households, out of which 45.4% had children under the age of 18 living with them, 57.8% were married couples living together, 14.1% had a female householder with no husband present, and 22.0% were non-families. 17.7% of all households were made up of individuals, and 7.4% had someone living alone who was 65 years of age or older. The average household size was 3.25 and the average family size was 3.69.

In the county, the population was spread out, with 34.5% under the age of 18, 10.3% from 18 to 24, 27.9% from 25 to 44, 17.8% from 45 to 64, and 9.5% who were 65 years of age or older. The median age was 29 years. For every 100 females there were 99.3 males. For every 100 females age 18 and over, there were 96.6 males.

The median income for a household in the county was $35,532, and the median income for a family was $38,009. Males had a median income of $31,721 versus $23,911 for females. The per capita income for the county was $14,257. About 16.9% of families and 21.7% of the population were below the poverty line, including 28.4% of those under age 18 and 10.7% of those age 65 or over.

As of 2008, according to the Lao Family Community, a nonprofit organization, about 8,000 Hmong lived in Merced County.

Government and policing

County Government
Merced County is a California Constitution defined general law county and is governed by an elected Board of Supervisors. The Board consists of five members, elected by districts, who serve four-year staggered terms.

Merced County Sheriff 
The Merced County Sheriff provides court protection, jail administration, and coroner service for the entire county. It provides patrol, detective, and other police services for the unincorporated parts of the county. The main sheriff station and offices are at Merced. There are two sheriff's substations. A Grand Jury report in 2010 stated that the Sheriff processed 12,746 average jail bookings per year with an average daily jail population of 1,123.

Municipal police departments
Municipal police departments in the county are: Merced, population 83,000; Los Banos, population 38,000; Atwater, population 30,000; Livingston, population 13,000; Gustine, population 6,000; Dos Palos, population 5,500.

State and federal representation 

Politics

Voter registration statistics

Cities by population and voter registration

Overview 
Merced County voted for the winning candidate for president in every election from 1972 to 2012, before voting for Hillary Clinton in 2016. Democrat Barack Obama won a majority in the county in both 2008 and 2012. Republican George W. Bush won a majority in the county in both 2000 and 2004.

  
  
  
  
  
  
  
  
  
  
  
  
  
  
  
  
  
  
  
  
  
  
  
  
  
  
  
  
  
  
  
  

According to the California Secretary of State, as of October 20, 2008, there were 97,179 registered voters in Merced County.  Of those, 44,704 (46.0%) are registered Democratic, 35,955 (37.0%) are registered Republican, 3,090 (3.2%) are registered with other political parties, and 13,430 (13.8%) declined to state a political party.  Atwater and the unincorporated areas of Merced County have Republican plurality registration advantages.  All of the other cities and towns in the county have Democratic pluralities or majorities in voter registration.

Merced County has been somewhat of a bellwether county for presidential elections. Since 1916, it has voted for the winner in each election except in 1956, 1968, and 2016. Despite a leftward shift in recent years, Merced County voted "Yes" in the 2021 California gubernatorial recall election despite the fact that it had voted for Newsom by a margin of 4% in the 2018 California gubernatorial election.

Crime 
The following table includes the number of incidents reported and the rate per 1,000 persons for each type of offense.

Cities by population and crime rates

Economy
According to America's Labor Market Information System 2014 report, the companies with the largest employment in Merced are, in alphabetical order:

Anberry Rehabilitation Hospital 	
Atwater Elementary Teachers 	
Bianchi & Sons Packing Co (produce)
E & J Gallo Winery 	
Foster Farms	
Golden Valley Health Center
Hilmar Cheese Company	
J. Marchini & Son (farming)
Liberty Packing Co 	
Live Oak Farms (produce)
Livingston District Office (education)
Malibu Boats West Inc 	
McLane Pacific (wholesale food services)
Merced County Human Services	
Mercy Medical Center Merced	
Pacific Gas and Electric Company	
Quad/Graphics (printing)
Sensient Dehydrated Flavors 	
University of California, Merced	
Walmart	
Werner Co (ladders)
Western Marketing & Sales (farming)
Yosemite Wholesale Warehouse 	 

Merced County grows 90% of California's sweet potato crop, due in part to the efforts of John Buttencourt Avila, called "the father of the sweet potato industry".

Transportation

Major highways
 Interstate 5
 State Route 33
 State Route 59
 State Route 99
 State Route 140
 State Route 152
 State Route 165

Public transportation
Merced County Transit, or "The Bus," provides local service in Merced as well as connecting service between most cities in Merced County.
The University of California, Merced, operates its own transit system, Cat Tracks. This system connects with Merced County Transit.
Yosemite Area Regional Transportation System, or YARTS, connects Merced with Yosemite National Park.
Greyhound buses and Amtrak trains provide long-distance intercity service.

Airports
Merced Regional Airport, located two miles (3 km) southwest of downtown Merced, provides passenger air service. General aviation airports in the county include Castle Airport, Gustine Airport, and Los Banos Municipal Airport.

Communities

Cities
Atwater
Dos Palos
Gustine
Livingston
Los Banos
Merced (county seat)

Census-designated places

Ballico
Bear Creek
Cressey
Delhi
Dos Palos Y
El Nido
Franklin
Hilmar-Irwin
Le Grand
McSwain
Planada
Santa Nella
Snelling
South Dos Palos
Stevinson
Tuttle
University of California Merced
Volta
Winton

Population ranking

The population ranking of the following table is based on the 2010 census of Merced County.

† county seat

Education
School districts include:

K-12:

 Dos Palos-Oro Loma Joint Unified School District
 Delhi Unified School District
 Gustine Unified School District
 Hilmar Unified School District
 Los Banos Unified School District
 Turlock Unified School District

Secondary:
 Le Grand Union High School District
 Merced Union High School District

Elementary:

 Atwater Elementary School District
 Ballico-Cressey Elementary School District
 El Nido Elementary School District
 Le Grand Union Elementary School District
 Livingston Union School District
 McSwain Union Elementary School District
 Merced City Elementary School District
 Merced River Union Elementary School District
 Plainsburg Union Elementary School District
 Planada Elementary School District
 Snelling-Merced Falls Union Elementary School District
 Weaver Union Elementary School District
 Winton School District

University of California Merced is in the county.

Places of interest
The former Castle Air Force Base and the United States Penitentiary, Atwater are located in an unincorporated area near Atwater.

See also

 List of California Historical Landmarks
 List of museums in the San Joaquin Valley
 List of school districts in Merced County, California
 National Register of Historic Places listings in Merced County, California

Notes

References

Further reading
 A Memorial and Biographical History of the Counties of Merced, Stanislaus, Calaveras, Tuolumne and Mariposa, California. Chicago: Lewis Publishing Co., 1892.

External links

 
California counties
San Joaquin Valley
1855 establishments in California